Arámbula is a Spanish surname. Notable people with the surname include:

Antonio Arámbula López (born 1968), Mexican politician
Aracely Arámbula (born 1975), Mexican actress, model, singer, television personality, and entrepreneur
Doroteo Arango Arámbula (1878–1923), general in the Mexican Revolution
Joaquin Arambula (born 1977), American politician
Juan Arambula (born 1952), American assemblyman
Román Arámbula (1936–2020), Mexican comic strip artist and animator
Ryan Arambula (born 1993), American soccer player

See also
Arámbulo

Spanish-language surnames